The 2015 Wichita Force season is the team's first season as a professional indoor football franchise and first as a member of Champions Indoor Football (CIF). One of nine teams in the CIF for the inaugural 2015 season, the Wichita Force is owned by Wichita Indoor Football LLC, led by managing partner Marv Fisher. The Force play their home games at the Intrust Bank Arena in Wichita, Kansas, under the direction of head coach Paco Martinez.

Season summary
The Force's announced schedule for the 2015 season was not directly affected when the New Mexico Stars abruptly postponed their entry into the league on February 21, just one week before the season began. On March 3, the Albuquerque-based Duke City Gladiators were announced as a late entry into the league, partially replacing the Stars in the CIF schedule with a plan to play 11 games in 2015.

Off-field moves
After the 2014 season ended, the Champions Professional Indoor Football League announced it was merging with teams from other leagues to form a new league, Champions Indoor Football. The Wichita Wild franchise folded after eight seasons and a new ownership group launched the Wichita Force as an expansion franchise in the CIF with the Wild's head coach and a significant number of their former players.

Awards and honors
Each week of the regular season, the CIF named league-wide Players of the Week in offensive, defensive, and special teams categories. For Week 1, the CIF named running back Tywon Hubbard as one of two Special Teams Players of the Week. For Week 2, the CIF named kick returner Clarence Anderson as the Special Teams Player of the Week. For Week 6, the CIF again named kick returner Clarence Anderson as the Special Teams Player of the Week. For Week 9, the CIF named kicker Ernesto Lacayo as the Special Teams Player of the Week. For Week 11, the CIF again named kicker Ernesto Lacayo as the Special Teams Player of the Week. For Week 13, the CIF yet again named kick returner Clarence Anderson as the Special Teams Player of the Week. For Week 14, the CIF named quarterback Emmanuel Taylor as the Offensive Player of the Week.

Schedule
Key:

Regular season

Post-season

Roster

Standings

Playoffs

References

External links
Wichita Force official website
Wichita Force at The Wichita Eagle 
Wichita Force at Our Sports Central

Wichita Force
Wichita Force
Wichita Force